Stephen Dwayne Newman (born October 15, 1964) is an American politician of the Republican Party. He has served in the Virginia General Assembly since 1991, first in the House (1991-1996) and then to the Senate of Virginia (1996–present). In 2016, Newman became president pro tempore of the Senate of Virginia. However, in the 2019 Virginia Senate election, although Newman won re-election from his district, Democrats won the majority. On January 8, 2020, Louise Lucas, a senior Democratic senator succeeded Newman as president pro tempore.

Early life and education
Newman was born on October 15, 1964, in Stuart, Virginia. His family later moved to Rustburg, Virginia, where he attended Liberty Christian Academy. Newman then attended Central Virginia Community College and Lynchburg College.

Career
Newman spent four years as a member of the Lynchburg City Council before being elected to the Virginia House of Delegates. He was a member of the House of Delegates from 1992 to 1996, and was elected to the Virginia Senate in 1995. He represents Senate District 23, which includes all of Botetourt and Craig counties and parts of Campbell County, Bedford County, Roanoke County, and Lynchburg City. His district is a safe Republican seat.

Newman is chair of the Senate Committee on Education and Health. Over his decades in the state legislature, Newman gained a reputation as a staunch conservative and a member with a talent for consensus-seeking and negotiation. In 2006, he was a sponsor of the Marshall-Newman Amendment, which banned same-sex marriage in Virginia. He opposed Medicaid expansion in Virginia. He opposed 2014 legislation to decriminalize marijuana in Virginia.

In January 2016, Newman was elected president pro tempore of the Senate of Virginiaand held that position until the 2020 General Assembly session began. The main duty of the pro tem is to preside over the state Senate when the lieutenant governor of Virginia (who is the president of the Senate) is unable to do so.

Notes

External links
Official campaign website

1964 births
21st-century American politicians
Living people
Republican Party members of the Virginia House of Delegates
People from Forest, Virginia
People from Stuart, Virginia
University of Lynchburg alumni
Republican Party Virginia state senators